Let’s Talk Science (French: Parlons sciences) is a registered Canadian charitable organization focused on education and skills development for children and youth in Canada through science, technology, engineering and math (STEM) based programs. Founded in London, Ontario in 1993, the head office remains in London, ON and there are two regional offices in Calgary, AB and St. John’s, NL. Dr. Bonnie Schmidt is the president and founder of Let's Talk Science.

History
Let’s Talk Science was founded in 1993 by Bonnie Schmidt, the current president, with contributions from Joan Francolini and the Lawson Foundation.  While completing a Ph.D. in Physiology at the University of Western Ontario, Schmidt visited local classrooms with some of her fellow graduate students, bringing them hands-on science activities and presentations. The aim was to promote an interest in STEM from an early age and to help children and youth build inquiry-based skills. 

The outreach program continues to grow with Let's Talk Science Outreach operating at 53 post-secondary schools from coast-to-coast-to-coast: 

 1993: University of Ottawa, Queen's University 
 1995: University of Victoria, Simon Fraser University 
 1996: Memorial University of Newfoundland
 1997: University of British Columbia, McMaster University, University of Toronto (St. George campus), University of Guelph
 1998: McGill University, University of Alberta, University of Winnipeg
 2000: Dalhousie University, University of Manitoba
 2001: University of Calgary, Carleton University and the Mississauga campus of the University of Toronto.
 2004: Scarborough campus of The University of Toronto, University of New Brunswick, University of Saskatchewan
 2005: Cambrian College signs on as the first Let's Talk Science Outreach college partner.
 2005: Laurentian University
 2008: York University, Université du Québec à Montréal, University of Waterloo 
 2009: Fleming College, Confederation College, University of PEI 
 2010: Cape Breton University, University of New Brunswick in St. John, Lethbridge University, Université de Sherbrooke.
 2011: Concordia University, University of Ontario Institute of Technology, Fanshawe College 
 2012: Memorial University of Newfoundland Grenfell campus, Mount Allison University 
 2013: University of Windsor, Loyalist College
 2015: Université de Moncton, Brock University
 2018: Lakehead University in Orillia and Thunder Bay, University of the Fraser Valley and University of British Columbia, Okanagan Campus, 
 2018: First Nations University of Canada, Aurora Research Institute Western Arctic Research Centre, Université du Québec à Chicoutimi 
 2019: Aurora Research Institute, South Slave Research Centre

Contributions made by volunteers have diversified into classroom activities, lab tours, science fair judging, the Let’s Talk Science Challenge, and the development of online resources. Let’s Talk Science now offers professional learning opportunities for educators, online resources for youth and educators, in addition to the outreach that still goes on in classrooms, virtually, and at community events across the country. Since 1993, Let’s Talk Science has impacted more than 9.5 million Canadian youth.

Programming

Let’s Talk Science Outreach 
A national program that connects educators and youth with trained post-secondary volunteers at over 50 Let’s Talk Science Outreach sites. Trained volunteers engage children from early years to Grade 12 in a variety of curriculum-aligned, hands-on STEM activities both virtually and in-person. Visits are offered in English and French (location dependent) and are customizable and flexible for classrooms, community groups, libraries, summer camps and after-school programs.

Online Educational Resources 
Let's Talk Science's website has a collection of curriculum-aligned STEM resources—lesson ideas, learning strategies, backgrounders, informative articles and career profiles in English and French. 

 Career Resources  Let’s Talk Science’s career resources are centred around a wide range of profiles from real people outlining what they were like in high school, their career path, what motivates them and why their jobs are important to others. There are also educator resources to help integrate career discussions into the classroom and take students to a deeper understanding of how STEM skills can advance and expand career options. The Let's Talk Careers competition is run twice a year in partnership with ChatterHigh, and in 2020 Skills Canada joined on as a partner.

Educator Professional Learning 
Let's Talk Science's educator professional learning programming incorporates digital literacy and global competencies to solve real-world problems in the classroom. Delivery options include webinars, live broadcasts, self-paced learning, in-person training, seminars, summits and summer institutes.

Projects 
Hands-on experiments that build inquiry and problem-solving skills as they learn to do real science and contribute to national databases. 

 Tomatosphere™  A free program where tomato seeds that have travelled to the International Space Station (ISS), or have been exposed to simulated space conditions, and a control group of seeds are provided to educators along with educational resources. Students plant the seeds and compare the germination rates of the two sets in a blind study. After submitting their results, participants discover which packet contained which seeds. The program uses the excitement of space exploration to teach students the skills and processes of scientific experimentation and inquiry.
 Living Space  Developed in partnership with the Canadian Space Agency, students study the key environmental conditions that are monitored on the ISS and develop their understanding of optimal ranges for human health. They collect data on their own environments and make a plan for environmental improvement based on those understandings. The national Living Space database allows students to compare their classroom data with information from other participating classrooms in Canada as well as data from the ISS.

Events 
Let’s Talk Science events allow students to interact with leading researchers, test their knowledge and design skills and participate in discussion about real-world STEM issues.

 The Let’s Talk Science Challenge  A team-based, competitive enrichment event for grades 6–8 students offered virtually and in-person. The Let’s Talk Science Challenge includes a knowledge challenge and an interactive, hands-on engineering design challenge.
 High School Symposiums  Full-, partial- or multi-day events hosted by post-secondary campuses across Canada that draw focus to timely and relevant STEM topics. Youth connect with leading researchers and volunteers to discuss the impact of their research and pathway to their current careers. Popular Symposiums include Let’s Talk Cancer, StemCellTalks, DNA Day, and Let’s Talk Neuroscience.

References

External links
Let's Talk Science
Tomatosphere

Organizations based in London, Ontario
Charities based in Canada
Companies based in London, Ontario
Educational organizations based in Ontario
Scientific organizations based in Canada